James Lyons (27 September 1897–1970) was an English footballer who played in the Football League for Derby County and Wrexham.

References

1897 births
1970 deaths
English footballers
Association football forwards
English Football League players
Hednesford Town F.C. players
Derby County F.C. players
Wrexham A.F.C. players
Stourbridge F.C. players
Cannock Town F.C. players